Sweden held a general election in September 1920. The election was the last before universal suffrage was introduced the following year. The Social Democratic Party remained the largest party, winning 75 of the 230 seats in the Second Chamber of the Riksdag. In spite of this, the non-socialist parties got a sizeable majority in the chamber.

Results

County results
1920 was the final occasion which saw nearly all counties split into multiple constituencies based on geography, before a mixed urban/rural single constituency with different allocations was introduced for the following year. Courtesy of Stockholm's size and it being the national capital, Stockholm County was separated into two separate counting areas and were thus listed separately in the contemporary statistics for counties. In Halland and Örebro counties, the two agrarian parties ran as one. This renders differences between the results published at a constituency and county level and the national results, thus in this table the agrarian coalition has been listed separately. A similar instance happened in the Norrköping and Linköping constituency where the Free-minded nationals and the Democratic Citizen Association decided on their joint list votes electing a representative for the latter. The list also consisted of the General Electoral League, which marked the foundation of the non-socialist bloc. In the county-wide tables, these votes were listed for the Free-minded nationals.

Percentage share

By votes

Results by city and district

Blekinge

Gothenburg and Bohuslän
There was a difference of one vote in the official tally for the southern constituency and the hundred/city numbers (10,899 vs 10,900). This caused a slight divergence of the numbers of ballots cast and the individual districts.

Gotland

Gävleborg

Halland

Jämtland

Jönköping

Kalmar

Kopparberg

Kristianstad

Kronoberg

Malmöhus

Norrbotten

Skaraborg

Stockholm

Stockholm (city)

Stockholm County

Södermanland

Uppsala

Värmland

Västerbotten

Västernorrland

Västmanland

Älvsborg

Örebro

Östergötland

References

Results 1920